Exclusive federal powers are powers within a federal system of government that each constituent political unit (such as a state or province) is absolutely or conditionally prohibited from exercising.  That is, either a constituent political unit may never exercise these powers, or may only do so with the consent of the federal government.

These powers are contrasted with concurrent powers, which are shared by both the federal government and each constituent political unit.

United States 
According to U.S. law, reserved powers (i.e. states' rights) belong exclusively to each state.  They are distinct from the enumerated powers that are listed in the Constitution of the United States, which include both concurrent powers and exclusive federal powers.

In Federalist No. 32, Alexander Hamilton described three distinct types of exclusive federal powers:This exclusive delegation, or rather this alienation, of State sovereignty, would only exist in three cases: [i] where the Constitution in express terms granted an exclusive authority to the Union; [ii] where it granted in one instance an authority to the Union, and in another prohibited the States from exercising the like authority; and [iii] where it granted an authority to the Union, to which a similar authority in the States would be absolutely and totally contradictory and repugnant.

Examples 

 The Constitution grants Congress power of "exclusive legislation" over the area now known as the District of Columbia.
 The Constitution says: "no state shall, without the consent of Congress, lay any imposts or duties on imports or exports, except for the purpose of executing its inspection laws."
 The Constitution gives Congress power to establish a "uniform rule" of naturalization throughout the country, and Hamilton says that there could be no uniform rule if each state has a distinct rule.

References

Federalism
Constitutional law
States' rights